Volodymyr Onyshchuk (born 21 July 1991) is a Ukrainian chess grandmaster.

Chess career
Born in 1991, Onyshchuk was awarded the International Master (IM) title in 2005 and received the Grandmaster (GM) title the seven years later.

Onyshchuk represented Ukraine at the European Youth Chess Championships and World Youth Chess Championships. He won three medals: gold in 2001 in Kallithea in European Youth Chess Championship in U10 age group and two silvers in 2003 in Budva in European Youth Chess Championship in U12 age group and in 2006 in Batumi World Youth Chess Championship in U16 age group. In 2006 in Kyiv Onyshchuk won the Nabokov Chess Memorial and won the World Youth U16 Chess Olympiad with Ukraine in Ağrı.

In 2007, he won a chess tournament in Kharkiv. In 2008, he shared first place in Warsaw in the Najdorf Memorial. In 2015 Onyshchuk shared first place with Li Chao in Cappelle-la-Grande Open and won the Metz Open.

In August 2017 Onyshchuk won the RTU Open "A" tournament in Riga.

References

External links

Volodymyr Onyshchuk chess games at 365Chess.com

1991 births
Sportspeople from Ivano-Frankivsk
Ukrainian chess players
Chess grandmasters
Living people